Celtic rock is a genre of folk rock, as well as a form of Celtic fusion which incorporates Celtic music, instrumentation and themes into a rock music context. It has been extremely prolific since the early 1970s and can be seen as a key foundation of the development of highly successful mainstream Celtic bands and popular musical performers, as well as creating important derivatives through further fusions. It has played a major role in the maintenance and definition of regional and national identities and in fostering a pan-Celtic culture. It has also helped to communicate those cultures to external audiences.

Definition
The style of music is the hybrid of traditional Irish, Scottish Gaelic, Welsh and Breton musical forms with rock music. This has been achieved by the playing of traditional music, particularly ballads, jigs and reels with rock instrumentation; by the addition of traditional Celtic instruments, including the Celtic harp, tin whistle, uilleann pipes (or Irish Bagpipes), fiddle, bodhrán, accordion, concertina, melodeon, and bagpipes (highland) to conventional rock formats; by the use of lyrics in Celtic languages and by the use of traditional rhythms and cadences in otherwise conventional rock music. Just as the validity of the term Celtic in general and as a musical label is disputed, the term Celtic rock cannot be taken to mean there was a unified Celtic musical culture between the Celtic nations. However, the term has remained useful as a means of describing the spread, adaptation and further development of the musical form in different but related contexts.

History

Ireland
It was in Ireland that Celtic rock was first clearly evident as musicians attempted to apply the use of traditional and electric music to their own cultural context. By the end of the 1960s Ireland already had perhaps the most flourishing folk music tradition and a growing blues and pop scene, which provided a basis for Irish rock. Perhaps the most successful product of this scene was the band Thin Lizzy. Formed in 1969 their first two albums were recognisably influenced by traditional Irish music and their first hit single "Whisky in the Jar" in 1972, was a rock version of a traditional Irish song. From this point they began to move towards the hard rock that allowed them to gain a series of hit singles and albums, but retained some occasional elements of Celtic rock on later albums such as Jailbreak (1976).

Formed in 1970, Horslips were the first Irish group to have the terms ‘Celtic rock’ applied to them, and produced work that included traditional Irish/Celtic music and instrumentation, Celtic themes and imagery, and concept albums based on Irish mythology in a way that entered the territory of progressive rock all powered by a hard rock sound. Horslips are considered important in the history of Irish rock as they were the first major band to enjoy success without having to leave their native country and can be seen as providing a template for Celtic rock in Ireland and elsewhere. These developments ran in parallel with the burgeoning folk revival in Ireland that included groups such as Planxty and the Bothy Band. It was from this tradition that Clannad, whose first album was released in 1973, adopted electric instruments and a more ‘new age’ sound at the beginning of the 1980s. Moving Hearts, formed in 1981 by former Planxty members Christy Moore and Donal Lunny, followed the pattern set by Horslips in combining Irish traditional music with rock, and also added elements of jazz to their sound.

Scotland
There were already strong links between Irish and Scottish music by the 1960s, with Irish bands like the Chieftains touring and outselling the native artists in Scotland. The adoption of folk rock produced groups including the JSD Band and Spencer's Feat. Out of the wreckage of the latter in 1974, was formed probably the most successful band in this genre, combining Irish and Scottish personnel to form Five Hand Reel. Two of the most successful groups of the 1980s emerged from the dance band circuit in Scotland. From 1978, when they began to release original albums, Runrig produced highly polished Scottish folk rock, including the first commercially successful album with the all Gaelic Play Gaelic in 1978. From the 1980s Capercaillie combined Scottish folk music, electric instruments and haunting vocals to considerable success. Scottish Band The Waterboys became a well known Celtic Rock band during the 80s with the release of albums such as This Is The Sea and Fisherman's Blues. They also incorporated folk elements into their music. One of Scotland's most commercially successful and fondly-remembered rock acts, Big Country, also incorporated the influence of traditional Scottish music into their songs. While bagpipes had become an essential element in Scottish folk bands they were much rarer in folk rock outfits, but were successfully integrated into their sound by Wolfstone from 1989, who focused on a combination of highland music and rock.

Brittany
The region of Brittany also made a major contribution to Celtic rock. The Breton cultural revival of the 1960s was exemplified by Alan Stivell who became the leading proponent of the Breton harp and other instruments from about 1960, he then adopted elements of Irish, Welsh and Scottish traditional music in an attempt to create a pan-Celtic folk music, which had considerable impact elsewhere, particularly in Wales and Cornwall. From 1972 he began to play folk rock with a band including guitarists Dan Ar Braz and Gabriel Yacoub. Yacoub went on to form Malicorne in 1974 one of the most successful folk rock bands in France. After an extensive career that included a stint playing as part of Fairport Convention in 1976, Ar Braz formed the pan-Celtic band Heritage des Celtes, who managed to achieve mainstream success in France in the 1990s. Probably the best known and most enduring folk rock band in France were Tri Yann formed in 1971 and still recording and performing today.

Wales
By the end of the 1960s Wales had produced some important individuals and bands that emerged as major British or international artists, this included power pop outfit Badfinger, psychedelic rockers Elastic Band and proto-heavy metal trio Budgie. But although folk groupings formed in the early 1970s, including Y Tebot Piws, Ac Eraill, and Mynediad am Ddim, it was not until 1973 that the first significant Welsh language rock band Edward H Dafis, originally a belated rock n’ roll outfit, caused a sensation by electrifying and attempting to use rock instrumentation while retaining Welsh language lyrics. As a result, for one generation listening to Welsh language rock music could now become a statement of national identity. This opened the door for a new rock culture but inevitably most Welsh language acts were unable to break through into the Anglophone dominated music industry.

Cornwall and the Isle of Man
Whereas other Celtic nations already had existing folk music cultures before the end of the 1960s this was less true in Cornwall and the Isle of Man, which were also relatively small in population and more integrated into English culture and (in the case of Cornwall) the British State. As a result, there was relatively little impact from the initial wave of folk electrification in the 1970s. However, the pan-Celtic movement, with its musical and cultural festivals helped foster some reflections in Cornwall where a few bands from the 1980s onwards utilised the traditions of Cornish music with rock, including Moondragon and its successor Lordryk. More recently the bands Sacred Turf, Skwardya and Krena, have been performing in the Cornish language.

Subgenres

Celtic punk

Ireland proved particularly fertile ground for punk bands in the mid-1970s, including Stiff Little Fingers, The Undertones, The Radiators From Space, The Boomtown Rats and The Virgin Prunes. Scotland also produced its fair share with acts including The Skids and The Rezillos. As with folk rock in England, the advent of punk and other musical trends undermined the folk element of Celtic rock, but in the early 1980s London based Irish band The Pogues created the subgenre Celtic punk by combining structural elements of folk music with a punk attitude and delivery. The Pogues' style of punked-up Irish music spawned and influenced a number of Celtic punk bands, including fellow London-Irish band Neck, Nyah Fearties from Scotland, Australia's Roaring Jack and Norway's Greenland Whalefishers.

Diaspora Celtic punk
One by-product of the Celtic Diaspora was the existence of large communities across the world that looked for their cultural roots and identity to their origins in the Celtic nations. While it seems young musicians from these communities usually chose between their folk culture and mainstream forms of music such as rock or pop, after the advent of Celtic punk relatively large numbers of bands began to emerge styling themselves as Celtic rock. This is particularly noticeable in the USA and Canada, where there are large communities descended from Irish and Scottish immigrants. From the USA this includes the Irish bands Flogging Molly, The Tossers, Dropkick Murphys, The Young Dubliners, LeperKhanz, Black 47, The Killdares, The Drovers and Jackdaw, and for Scottish bands Prydein, Seven Nations and Flatfoot 56. From Canada are bands like The Mahones, Enter the Haggis, Great Big Sea, The Real Mckenzies and Spirit of the West. These groups were naturally influenced by American forms of music, some containing members with no Celtic ancestry and commonly singing in English. A band in England is The BibleCode Sundays,. In France, The Booze Brothers have been playing celtic punk rock since 1999.

Celtic metal

Like Celtic rock in the 1970s, Celtic metal resulted from the application of a development in English music, when in the 1990s thrash metal band Skyclad added violins, and with them jigs and folk voicings, to their music on the album The Wayward Sons of Mother Earth (1990). This inspired the Dublin based band Cruachan to mix traditional Irish music with black metal and to create the subgenre of Celtic metal. They were soon followed by bands such as Primordial and Waylander. Like Celtic punk, Celtic metal replicates the fusing the Celtic folk tradition with contemporary forms of music.

Influence
Whereas in England folk rock, after initial mainstream recognition, subsided into the status of a sub-cultural soundtrack, in many Celtic communities and nations it has remained at the forefront of musical production. The initial wave of Celtic rock in Ireland, although ultimately feeding into Anglo-American dominated progressive rock and hard rock provided a basis for Irish bands that would enjoy international success, including the Pogues and U2: one making use of the tradition of Celtic music in a new context and the other eschewing it for a distinctive but mainstream sound. Similar circumstances can be seen in Scotland albeit with a delay in time while Celtic rock culture developed, before bands like Runrig could achieve international recognition. Widely acknowledged as one of the outstanding voices in Celtic/rock is Brian McCombe (born Glasgow, Scotland, United Kingdom) of The Brian McCombe Band, a pan Celtic group based in Brittany.

In other Celtic communities, and particularly where Celtic speakers or descendants are a minority, the function of Celtic rock has been less to create mainstream success, than to bolster cultural identity. A consequence of this has been the reinforcement of pan-Celtic culture and of particular national or regional identities between those with a shared heritage, but who are widely dispersed. However, perhaps the most significant consequence of Celtic rock has simply been as a general spur to immense musical and cultural creativity.

Celtic rock has also influenced musicians from the non-Celtic regions, with some of them, like Balkans, spawning their own Celtic rock scenes, which contributed to the interest for Celtic music and culture. The pioneers of Celtic rock on the Yugoslav rock scene were the pub/garage rock band Roze Poze in the mid-1980s. In the 1990s, bands like Orthodox Celts from Serbia and Belfast Food from Croatia popularized Celtic rock further, influencing a number of younger acts, like Irish Stew of Sindidun.

See also
 List of Celtic rock artists

Notes

Further reading 
Colin Harper. Irish Folk, Trad and Blues: A Secret History (2005) covers Horslips, The Pogues, Planxty and others.
Tony Clayton-Lea. Irish Rock: Where It's Comes From - Where It's At - Where It's Going (1992)
Larry Kirwan. Green Suede Shoes (2005)
Gerry Smyth. Noisy Island: A Short History of Irish Popular Music
Sean Campbell and Gerry Smyth. Beautiful Day: 40 Years Of Irish Rock (2005)

External links
Irish Rockers
Shite 'n' Onions
Paddy Rock
Spanish Celtic Rock Music
Irish Punk

 
Celtic music